Jacques Suire (born 18 February 1943) is a former French cyclist. He competed at the 1960 Summer Olympics and the 1964 Summer Olympics.

References

External links
 

1943 births
Living people
French male cyclists
Olympic cyclists of France
Cyclists at the 1960 Summer Olympics
Cyclists at the 1964 Summer Olympics
People from Talence
French track cyclists
Sportspeople from Gironde
Cyclists from Nouvelle-Aquitaine
21st-century French people
20th-century French people